Sylian Aldren Mokono (born 22 March 1999) is a Dutch footballer who plays as a right-back for Heracles Almelo.

Club career
He made his Eerste Divisie debut for Jong FC Utrecht on 27 August 2018 in a game against NEC, as a 63rd-minute substitute for Rick Mulder.

He made his Eredivisie debut for FC Utrecht on 29 November 2020 in a game against Feyenoord.

On 20 July 2022, Mokono signed a three-year contract with Heracles Almelo.

Personal life
Born in the Netherlands, Mokono is of South African descent.

References

External links
 

1999 births
Living people
Footballers from Utrecht (city)
Dutch footballers
Dutch people of South African descent
Dutch sportspeople of African descent
Association football fullbacks
Jong FC Utrecht players
FC Utrecht players
Heracles Almelo players
Eerste Divisie players
Eredivisie players